Pakruojis City Stadium is a multi-purpose stadium in Pakruojis, Lithuania. It opened in 1989 and is used mostly for football matches. It is the home arena for FC Pakruojis and former A Lyga club FK Kruoja.

In 2010 stadium was renovated. Capacity was increased to 2,000 seats, new technical area added. It currently holds 1st UEFA stadiums category.

References

FC Pakruojis
Sport in Pakruojis
Football venues in Lithuania
Buildings and structures in Šiauliai County
Multi-purpose stadiums in Lithuania
Sports venues completed in 1989